Lal Dupatta Malmal Ka is a 1989 Hindi made-for-television movie. Although it was just a telefilm and not released on the big screen, it was a huge success. The movie is known for its popular songs sung by Anuradha Paudwal, Udit Narayan, Mohd. Aziz. The music for the songs was provided by Anand–Milind. It starred Sahil Chaddha and Veverly in leading roles. A sequel titled Phir Lehraya Lal Dupatta Malmal Ka was made later that year with Sahil and Veverly reprising their roles.

Plot 

This is a romantic drama movie.

Cast
 Sahil Chaddha as Shalu
 Veverly as Shabbo
 Gulshan Kumar
 Dan Dhanoa as Banwari
 Vijayendra Ghatge as Chaudhary 
 Ram Mohan as Shabbo's Father

Soundtrack
All the songs were hugely popular, mostly sung by 80s & 90s leading singers  Anuradha Paudwal and Mohammad Aziz. Suresh Wadkar, Pankaj Udhas, and Udit Narayan also lent voice to some songs. Majrooh Sultanpuri was the lyricist.

Notes and references

External links
 

1989 television films
1989 films
1980s Hindi-language films
1989 romantic drama films
Films scored by Anand–Milind
Indian romantic drama films
Indian television films